Alexei Nikolayevich Kalyuzhny (born June 13, 1977) is a Belarusian former professional ice hockey forward. He last played for HC Dinamo Minsk of the Kontinental Hockey League. He participated at the 2010 IIHF World Championship as a member of the Belarus National men's ice hockey team.

Career statistics

Regular season and playoffs

International

References

External links
 

1977 births
Living people
Avangard Omsk players
Belarusian ice hockey centres
Expatriate ice hockey players in Russia
HC Dinamo Minsk players
HC Dynamo Moscow players
Metallurg Magnitogorsk players
HC Neftekhimik Nizhnekamsk players
Ice hockey players at the 1998 Winter Olympics
Ice hockey players at the 2002 Winter Olympics
Ice hockey players at the 2010 Winter Olympics
Lokomotiv Yaroslavl players
Olympic ice hockey players of Belarus
Severstal Cherepovets players
Ice hockey people from Minsk
Yunost Minsk players